Reasnor is a city in Jasper County, Iowa, United States. The population was 152 at the time of the 2020 census.

History
Reasnor was platted in the summer of 1877, and named for its founders, Samuel and Mary Reasoner.

Geography
Reasnor is located at  (41.578495, -93.022814).

Demographics

2010 census
As of the census of 2010, there were 152 people, 68 households, and 46 families living in the city. The racial makeup of the city was 99.3% White and 0.7% from other races. Hispanic or Latino of any race were 0.7% of the population.

There were 68 households, of which 26.5% had children under the age of 18 living with them, 48.5% were married couples living together, 17.6% had a female householder with no husband present, 1.5% had a male householder with no wife present, and 32.4% were non-families. 26.5% of all households were made up of individuals, and 14.7% had someone living alone who was 65 years of age or older. The average household size was 2.24 and the average family size was 2.63.

The median age in the city was 47 years. 20.4% of residents were under the age of 18; 5.3% were between the ages of 18 and 24; 22.3% were from 25 to 44; 28.9% were from 45 to 64; and 23% were 65 years of age or older. The gender makeup of the city was 48.7% male and 51.3% female.

2000 census
As of the census of 2000, there were 194 people, 77 households, and 52 families living in the city. The racial makeup of the city was 98.97% White, and 1.03% from two or more races.

There were 77 households, out of which 29.9% had children under the age of 18 living with them, 61.0% were married couples living together, 3.9% had a female householder with no husband present, and 31.2% were non-families. 29.9% of all households were made up of individuals, and 14.3% had someone living alone who was 65 years of age or older. The average household size was 2.52 and the average family size was 3.09.

In the city, the population was spread out, with 27.3% under the age of 18, 6.2% from 18 to 24, 27.3% from 25 to 44, 23.2% from 45 to 64, and 16.0% who were 65 years of age or older. The median age was 37 years. For every 100 females, there were 102.1 males. For every 100 females age 18 and over, there were 98.6 males.

The median income for a household in the city was $37,500, and the median income for a family was $40,500. Males had a median income of $26,000 versus $20,417 for females. The per capita income for the city was $14,435. About 1.9% of families and 4.2% of the population were below the poverty line, including 4.9% of those under the age of eighteen and 10.0% of those 65 or over.

Education
The PCM Community School District operates public schools serving the community. This district was formed on July 1, 1991 by a merger of the Prairie City and Monroe school districts. Residents are zoned to PCM Middle School in Prairie City and PCM Community High School in Monroe.

References

Cities in Jasper County, Iowa
Cities in Iowa
1877 establishments in Iowa
Populated places established in 1877